Saint Carantoc, also anglicized as Carantock, Carannog and by other spellings, was a 6th-century abbot, confessor, and saint in Wales and the West Country. He is credited with founding Llangrannog, Ceredigion, Wales and St Carantoc's Church, Crantock. His name is listed amongst the Cornish Saints. Carantoc's is one of five insular saints' lives and two Breton ones that mention Arthur in contexts that may be independent of Geoffrey of Monmouth's Historia Regum Britanniae. He is venerated by the Eastern Orthodox Church and Roman Catholic Church.

Life and legend
Cadoc's early vita takes the form of a short homily. Many details of his life are obscure or contradictory. Ceredigion is given as his birthplace, sua proprio regio. He was the son of Corwn, grandson of King Ceredig and Queen Meleri of Ceredigion. To escape being elected king, he fled to Llangrannog. The shavings he produced for lighting a fire there were carried away as soon as they were made by a dove: where the bird alighted, Carantoc built the present church (This story is sometimes ascribed to Crantock in Cornwall, where the parish church is dedicated to Saint Carantoc but according to the early Life in the Léon Breviary, which concentrates on Carantoc's early life, set in Ireland, occurred in Wales).

He probably moved to Cornwall before preaching for some time in Ireland, around Dulane in County Meath and Inis-Baithen in Leinster. It is also sometimes said that he spent time in Brittany where there is a town also named Carantec: stories set in Brittany replicate those from Britain.

Carantoc's place of death and burial is disputed between Inis Baithen and Dulane. His feast day is 16 May.

Carantoc and Arthur
In the most famous incident of Carantoc's life, the saint, having returned to Wales, crossed the Bristol Channel, looking for his portable altar. He arrived on the banks of the River Willett and came into conflict with both King Cado of Dumnonia and King Arthur at Dunster in Somerset.

Carantoc was eventually obliged to defeat a ferocious dragon in order to retrieve his altar and, in return, was given land at nearby Carhampton to found a monastery.

Notes

References

 Lives of the Cambro British saints, William Jenkins Rees,  Thomas Wakeman, 1835

Children of Cunedda
Arthurian characters
Medieval Cornish saints
People from Ceredigion
6th-century Christian saints
6th-century English people
6th-century Welsh people